The Pour la vertu militaire (Fr.: for military virtue) was a military order of merit established on 25 February 1769 by Frederick II, Landgrave of Hesse-Kassel. The order, modelled on the Prussian Pour le Mérite, could be awarded in a single class to officers of Hessian army or allied armies for wartime or peacetime military merit. When awarded for peacetime merit, only officers from major upwards were eligible. In 1820 the French name was changed to German: Militär-Verdienstorden (Order of Military Merit). It was discontinued in 1866, after the annexation of Hessen-Kassel by the Kingdom of Prussia.

References
 Gottschalck, Friedrich (1807). Almanach der Ritterorden, Leipzig 
 Gritzner, Maximilian (1893). Handbuch der Ritter- und Verdienstorden aller Kulturstaaten der Welt, Leipzig 
 Nimmergut, Jörg (1997). Deutsche Orden und Ehrenzeichen bis 1945 Pt. 1: Anhalt–Hohenzollern,München, 

Courage awards
Orders of chivalry of Germany
House of Hesse-Kassel
Orders, decorations, and medals of Hesse